Muhammad Sadiq Sanjrani (born 14 April 1978) is a Pakistani politician who is from Balochistan and is the 8th and current Chairman of the Senate of Pakistan. He took his oath of office as a Member and Chairman of the Senate of Pakistan on 12 March 2018. He is the youngest and first-ever Chairman of the Senate of Pakistan who hails from the province of Balochistan. He belongs to the well-educated Sanjrani tribe.

Early life and education
Sanjrani was born on 14 April 1978 in Nok Kundi, Balochistan, Pakistan.

He received his early education from Nok Kundi and then moved to Islamabad from where he did his degree.

Political career
Sanjrani began his political career in 1998 as coordinator of the team of then Prime Minister Nawaz Sharif where he served until the 1999 Pakistani coup d'état.

In 2008, he was made in-charge of the Prime Minister's Yousaf Raza Gillani Grievance Cell at the Prime Minister's Secretariat where he remained for five years.

Sanjrani was elected to the Senate of Pakistan as an independent candidate on a general seat from Balochistan in the 2018 Pakistani Senate election. He took his oath as Senator on 12 March 2018. On the same day, he was elected as the 8th Chairman of the Senate of Pakistan. He received 57 votes out of a total 103 votes cast and defeated Raja Zafar ul Haq, a candidate of the Pakistan Muslim League (N) who obtained 46 votes. Sanjrani was voted into the chairmanship by the Pakistan Peoples Party, Muttahida Qaumi Movement, Pakistan Tehreek-e-Insaf, and independent Senators from Balochistan and the Federally Administered Tribal Areas. He became the first ever Chairman of the Senate who hailed from the province of Balochistan and became the youngest-ever Chairman of the Senate at the age of 39. He was a relatively lesser-known figure in Pakistan's political spectrum prior to being elected as Chairman of the Senate.

In September 2018, Sanjrani addressed the National Assembly of Azerbaijan on the eve of its 100th anniversary.

On 1 August 2019, a no-confidence motion was presented by the opposition parties in the senate to remove him from the post of the Chairman of the Senate. The resolution was tabled in the Senate with 64 senators in support of it. The no-confidence motion failed to pass because the opposition parties only gathered 50 votes, 3 votes short of the resolution passing. Sanjrani still stands as the Chairman of the Senate of Pakistan after having survived the no-confidence vote. This was seen as a clear victory of the PTI government coalition and a confirmation of the senators having confidence in the chairman.

On 12 March 2021, he was re-elected as Chairman of the Senate of Pakistan, defeating his rival Syed Yusuf Raza Gillani.

References

Living people
1978 births
People from Chagai District
Members of the Senate of Pakistan
Chairmen of the Senate of Pakistan
Baloch people
University of Balochistan alumni
Acting presidents of Pakistan
Presidents of Pakistan